Rooney L. Bowen, Jr. (July 25, 1933 – March 3, 2016) was an American politician in the state of Georgia.

Born in Dooly County, Georgia, Bowen graduated from Unadilla High School and then attended the University of Georgia. He was an automobile dealer, farmer, and funeral director. Bowen lived in Cordele, Georgia. Bowen served in the Georgia House of Representatives from 1963 to 1973. He then served in the Georgia State Senate from 1980 to 2005. Bowen was a member of the Democratic Party. In 2002, Bowen switched to the Republican Party. He died in Cordele, Georgia in 2016.

References

1933 births
2016 deaths
People from Cordele, Georgia
People from Dooly County, Georgia
Georgia (U.S. state) state senators
Members of the Georgia House of Representatives
Businesspeople from Georgia (U.S. state)
Georgia (U.S. state) Democrats
Georgia (U.S. state) Republicans
University of Georgia alumni
21st-century American politicians
American United Methodists
20th-century American businesspeople
20th-century Methodists